Dimmitt is a city and county seat in Castro County, Texas, United States. Its population was 4,393 at the 2010 census.

History
Dimmitt is located on the old Ozark Trail, a road system from St. Louis, Missouri, to El Paso, Texas. The Ozark Trail is marked at the courthouse.

In 1942, a meteorite was discovered in Castro County and named after the town of Dimmitt. It is one of 311 approved meteorites from Texas.

Geography

Dimmitt is located slightly west of the center of Castro County at  (34.549052, –102.315355).

U.S. Route 385 passes through the city, leading north  to Hereford, the seat of Deaf Smith County, and south  to Springlake. Texas State Highway 86 crosses US 385 near the center of town and leads east  to Tulia and west  to Bovina.

Climate

Demographics

2020 census

As of the 2020 United States census,  4,171 people, 1,458 households, and 1,016 families were residing in the city.

2010 census
As of the 2010 United States Census, 4,393 people were living in the city. The racial makeup of the city was 68.8% Hispanic or Latino, 27.6% White, 2.3% Black, 0.3% Native American, 0.5% Asian, 0.1% from some other race, and 0.3% from two or more races.

2000 census
As of the census of 2000,  4,375 people, 1,464 households, and 1,124 families were living in the city. The population density was 2,116.4 people per square mile (816.0/km). The 1,692 housing units had an average density of 818.5 per square mile (315.6/km). The racial makeup of the city was 75.02% White, 2.99% African American, 1.69% Native American, 18.10% from other races, and 2.19% from two or more races. Hispanics or Latinos of any race were 56.94% of the population.

Of the 1,464 households, 39.6% had children under 18 living with them, 60.7% were married couples living together, 12.0% had a female householder with no husband present, and 23.2% were not families. About 22.1% of all households were made up of individuals, and 12.4% had someone living alone who was 65 or older. The average household size was 2.94 and the average family size was 3.46.

In the city, the age distribution was 33.4% under 18, 9.1% from 18 to 24, 22.2% from 25 to 44, 21.3% from 45 to 64, and 13.9% who were 65 or older. The median age was 32 years. For every 100 females, there were 93.8 males. For every 100 females age 18 and over, there were 89.5 males.

The median income for a household in the city was $27,454, and for a family was $33,885. Males had a median income of $24,575 versus $20,162 for females. The per capita income for the city was $14,228. About 19.0% of families and 23.1% of the population were below the poverty line, including 31.1% of those under age 18 and 16.4% of those age 65 or over.

Education
Dimmitt is served by the Dimmitt Independent School District. The district has a history in sports, mainly basketball. The Bobcats and Bobbies have won several state championships.

Bobbies
 1953–1954 1A-2A Dimmitt
 1954–1955 1A Dimmitt
 1992–1993 3A Dimmitt

Bobcats
 1951–1952 1A-2A Division 2 Dimmitt
 1974–1975 2A Dimmitt
 1981–1982 3A Dimmitt
 1982–1983 3A Dimmitt

Healthcare
Dimmitt is served by the Castro County Healthcare System. It also serves the surrounding county and the cities of Nazareth and Hart.

Notable people

 Junior Coffey, former NFL football player
 Kent Hance, former U.S. Representative from the Texas South Plains, former member of the Texas Railroad Commission, and the chancellor of Texas Tech University in Lubbock since 2006; born in Dimmitt and graduated in 1961 from Dimmitt High School
 Herbert E. Mayfield (1920–2008), Bluegrass musician; grew up in Dimmitt. Herb Mayfield lived there through adulthood and was a former president of the Dimmitt Rodeo Association
 Smokey Mayfield (1924–2008), Bluegrass musician
 Thomas Edward "Edd" Mayfield (1926–1958), bluegrass musician
 Lometa Odom (1933–2017) basketball player and coach, member of the Women's Basketball Hall of Fame

Gallery

References

External links
 Dimmitt Chamber of Commerce

See also

Cities in Castro County, Texas
Cities in Texas
County seats in Texas